Satya Rhodes-Conway (born November 3, 1971) is an American politician. She was a member of the Madison Common Council between 2007 and 2013. In 2019, Rhodes-Conway was elected Mayor of Madison, Wisconsin. She is the first out lesbian and first openly LGBTQ person  elected to that office, and only the second woman to hold the post.

Early life and career
Satya Rhodes-Conway was born in 1971, in Española, New Mexico, and raised in Ithaca, New York. She attended Smith College and earned a master’s degree from the University of California, Irvine. Rhodes-Conway moved to Madison, Wisconsin, around 2000. She worked at the State Environmental Resource Center, as a senior associate with the University of Wisconsin's Center on Wisconsin Strategy, and served on several municipal committees, as chair of the Long Range Metro Transit Ad Hoc Planning Committee, and a subcommittee member of the Commission on the Environment. Rhodes-Conway became managing director of the University of Wisconsin–Madison Mayors Innovation Project in 2005.

Political career
Rhodes-Conway has been endorsed by the Green Party of the United States, the Progressive Dane party and the Democratic Party in bids for political office. She began campaigning for Brian Benford's open seat on the Madison Common Council in December 2006, and was one of nine new alders elected to the Madison Common Council in 2007. Rhodes-Conway announced in November 2012 that she would not run for reelection, and stepped down from the position upon the end of her third term in April 2013. She was succeeded in office by Larry Palm.

2019 mayoral campaign
Rhodes-Conway announced that she would run for the mayorship in May 2018. She and incumbent mayor Paul Soglin were the top two finishers in a primary held on February 19, 2019. The 2019 mayoral primary was Madison's most expensive, as six candidates raised a total of $453,365; $83,331 of that total was raised by Rhodes-Conway's campaign. Rhodes-Conway finished second, 323 votes behind Soglin, to advance to the general election.

Rhodes-Conway's campaign focused on a short list of issues, including bring bus rapid transit to Madison, increasing the supply of affordable housing, combatting climate change, and promoting racial equity. During the primary, Rhodes-Conway's support came largely from the Isthmus and neighboring wards. Debates between Rhodes-Conway and Soglin covered a number of topics, including affordable housing, the municipal economy, public safety, and policing. Rhodes-Conway won support from Wisconsin State Assemblywoman Terese Berceau and Dane County Executive Joe Parisi. She was subsequently endorsed by the Wisconsin State Journal editorial board, The Capital Times, and The Daily Cardinal. Throughout the campaign, Rhodes-Conway raised more money than Soglin, and spent more on expenditures. Milwaukee County Executive Chris Abele spent $47,000 on mailings supportive of Rhodes-Conway's mayoral bid, an amount described by the Wisconsin State Journal as "unusual, if not unprecedented," due to its origin outside of Dane County.

Rhodes-Conway defeated Soglin in the April 2, 2019 election, earning victory with over 61 percent of the vote. Voter turnout was approximately 36 percent. Rhodes-Conway's electoral victory was driven by large margins in the Isthmus, Near East Side, and West Side. She managed to flip wards in the Far East Side and West Side, parts of the city that previously voted for Soglin. In a ward near Capitol Square, Rhodes-Conway won by a 68.5-point margin. She is the second woman to be elected mayor of Madison and the first openly gay person elected to the office. Lori Lightfoot was elected Mayor of Chicago on the same day Rhodes-Conway won Madison's mayoral election. Former Mayor of Houston Annise Parker stated that both victories "leave us well-positioned to make 2019 the year of the lesbian mayor."

Mayoralty
Rhodes-Conway was inaugurated as mayor of Madison on April 16, 2019. On her first day as mayor, she held a joint press conference with Dane County Executive Joe Parisi to announce a maintenance and reconstruction agreement for Buckeye Road. It was a compromise that Parisi could not work out with Soglin in the months preceding the election.

Controversy over response to 2020 protests 
Starting in May 2020, protests spread across the United States in response to the murder of George Floyd. Protests in Madison began on May 30. Initially, Rhodes-Conway seemed supportive of the demonstrations, stating "George Floyd should be alive tonight and the fact that he isn't, is an American tragedy...I also want to say that I completely agree with the protestors that were around the capitol square and right here in front of this building earlier today. I agree with their message, I agree with their right to protest and I agree with how determinedly and peacefully they protested today."

However, after protesters were tear-gassed by police on the first night of demonstrations, tensions escalated. Alice Herman, writing for Tone Madison, recounted that "As protesters—chanting 'hands up, don't shoot,' and repeating George Floyd's name—advanced from the campus end of State Street toward the Capitol, cops formed barricades across the street, repeatedly deploying tear gas to route the advancing protesters into side streets. The tear gas set off panicked stampedes, which were the most frightening and dangerous moments of the day." Multiple Madison alders (Rebecca Kemble, Donna Moreland, Max Prestigiacomo, Arvina Martin, Marsha Rummel, Tag Evers, and Grant Foster) released a statement condemning the tear-gassing of protesters.

The next day, Rhodes-Conway declared a state of emergency and imposed a 9:30 pm curfew on the isthmus area of the city, stating "I want to be clear that this is in response to a number of people endangering themselves and others by shattering glass, destroying property, and engaging in widespread, systematic looting of local businesses."

On June 3, Rhodes-Conway released a password-protected video, intended only for consumption by Madison Police Department members; however, the video was leaked to the public. In the video, Rhodes-Conway stated "You must be exhausted. I know I am, and you're facing a much more difficult situation than I am. It must be absolutely infuriating to stand in heavy gear outside while listening to people constantly insult your chosen profession...You are not what the protesters say you are. I know that...I was so focused on the task of addressing the concerns of our community that I didn’t remember that you need and deserve both recognition and appreciation."

The video was apparently leaked by a member of the "We Stand With The Madison Police Department" Facebook group. Angry that Rhodes-Conway would not take a public stance in support of police, they accompanied it with this message: "If you know your police are doing well get out there (and) say it publicly. Stop kowtowing." After the video was leaked, Rhodes-Conway likewise came under fire from supporters of the protests, who were disturbed by the dissonance between her public statements and her private one.

Rhodes-Conway apologized for the statements made in the leaked video, saying "Black lives matter. I believe deeply in this and yet I failed to center this in my message to the police department...I realize I may have done irreparable harm with my actions, and I realize too that I may have permanently lost any trust I had."

In response to the mayor's inability to take a solid stance on the protest, a recall effort was launched in 2020. However, it failed to gather enough signatures in the allotted timeframe.

Personal life
Satya Rhodes-Conway's mother, Anne Rhodes, is an artist. Her father, Bob Conway, is a manager of art collections. Her parents divorced when she was five years old, and her mother subsequently came out as a lesbian. Satya Rhodes-Conway and Amy Klusmeier have been partners since 2009.

References

1971 births
21st-century American women politicians
21st-century American politicians
Lesbian politicians
LGBT mayors of places in the United States
American LGBT city council members
LGBT people from New Mexico
LGBT people from New York (state)
LGBT people from Wisconsin
Living people
Mayors of Madison, Wisconsin
People from Española, New Mexico
Politicians from Ithaca, New York
Smith College alumni
University of Wisconsin–Madison staff
Wisconsin city council members
Wisconsin Democrats
Women city councillors in Wisconsin
Women mayors of places in Wisconsin
University of California, Irvine alumni